Apollonia was the ancient chief town of Chalcidice in Macedonia, situated north of Olynthus, and a little south of the Chalcidian mountains. That this Apollonia is a different place from Apollonia in Mygdonia, appears from Xenophon, who describes the Chalcidian Apollonia as distant  from Olynthus. It was probably this Apollonia that struck the beautiful Chalcidian coins, bearing on the obverse the head of Apollo, and on the reverse his lyre, with the legend .  Demosthenes claims that Apollonia was among the Greek cities destroyed by Philip II of Macedon, probably during his war against the Chalcidian League in 348 BCE when he also destroyed Olynthus.

See also
 List of ancient Greek cities

References

Greek colonies in Chalcidice
Former populated places in Greece
Populated places in ancient Macedonia
Lost ancient cities and towns